Pratval is a former municipality in the district of Hinterrhein in the Swiss canton of Graubünden. On 1 January 2015 the former municipalities of Almens, Paspels, Pratval, Rodels and Tomils merged to form the new municipality of Domleschg.

History
Pratval is first mentioned in 1345 as Prau de Valle.

Geography

It is the smallest municipality in Graubünden. Of this area, 55% is used for agricultural purposes, while 26.3% is forested. Of the rest of the land, 17.5% is settled (buildings or roads) and the remainder (1.3%) is non-productive (rivers, glaciers or mountains).

The former municipality is located in the Domleschg sub-district, of the Hinterrhein district. It consists of the settlements of Gross- and Kleinrietberg, Rietbach, Mühle and Hof. All five settlements are located on a plateau east of the Hinterrhine river.

Demographics
Pratval had a population (as of 2013) of 254. , 4.7% of the population was made up of foreign nationals. Over the last 10 years the population has decreased at a rate of -5.6%.

, the gender distribution of the population was 44.0% male and 56.0% female. The age distribution, in Pratval is; 41 people or 17.1% of the population are between 0 and 9 years old. 17 people or 7.1% are 10 to 14, and 14 people or 5.8% are 15 to 19. Of the adult population, 17 people or 7.1% of the population are between 20 and 29 years old. 51 people or 21.3% are 30 to 39, 48 people or 20.0% are 40 to 49, and 15 people or 6.3% are 50 to 59. The senior population distribution is 16 people or 6.7% of the population are between 60 and 69 years old, 13 people or 5.4% are 70 to 79, there are 8 people or 3.3% who are 80 to 89.

In the 2007 federal election the most popular party was the SPS which received 41.9% of the vote. The next three most popular parties were the SVP (27.6%), the FDP (16.8%) and the CVP (6.9%).

In Pratval about 84.4% of the population (between age 25-64) have completed either non-mandatory upper secondary education or additional higher education (either university or a Fachhochschule).

Pratval has an unemployment rate of 0.14%. , there were 15 people employed in the primary economic sector and about 4 businesses involved in this sector. 2 people are employed in the secondary sector and there is 1 business in this sector. 15 people are employed in the tertiary sector, with 5 businesses in this sector.

The historical population is given in the following table:

Languages
Most of the population speaks German (94.6%), with Romansh being second most common ( 4.2%) and French being third ( 0.4%).

References

External links
 Official Web site

Former municipalities of Graubünden
Populated places disestablished in 2015
2015 disestablishments in Switzerland
Domleschg